Andre Allen (born June 30, 1973) is a former Canadian football defensive end who played one game for the Winnipeg Blue Bombers of the Canadian Football League in 1995, recording a single tackle. He played college football for the Northern Iowa Panthers.

References 

1973 births
Living people
American football defensive ends
Canadian football defensive linemen
Northern Iowa Panthers football players
Winnipeg Blue Bombers players
Players of Canadian football from Mississippi
Players of American football from Mississippi
People from Itta Bena, Mississippi